Gotan railway station is a railway station in Nagaur district, Rajasthan. Its code is GOTN. It serves Gotan village. The station consists of a pair of platforms. Passenger and Express trains halt here. Sarpanch :- Mr. Bhawarlal Meghwal.

Trains

The following trains halt at Gotan railway station in both directions:

 Malani Express
 Bandra Terminus–Jammu Tawi Vivek Express
 Bhagat Ki Kothi–Bilaspur Express
 Ahmedabad–Jammu Tawi Express
 Mandore Express
 Ranthambore Express
 Jaipur–Jodhpur Intercity Express
 Marudhar Express
 Ranakpur Express
 Kalka–Barmer Express
 Bhagat Ki Kothi–Mannargudi Weekly Express
 [[Jodhpur - Jaipur Daily Intercity]
 [[Jaipur - Jodhpur Daily Intercity]

References

Railway stations in Nagaur district
Jodhpur railway division